Christopher C. Piazza is a Division 2 judge of the Arkansas Sixth Circuit.

Notable rulings

Wright v. Arkansas
On May 9, 2014, Piazza ruled the ban on same-sex marriage in the state of Arkansas was unconstitutional, which legalized same-sex marriage in the state.

Arkansas Department of Human Services v. Cole
On April 16, 2010, Piazza overturned Arkansas Act 1 in the case of Arkansas Department of Human Services v. Cole which makes it illegal for any individuals cohabiting outside of a valid marriage to adopt or provide foster care to minors. The ruling was upheld unanimously by the Arkansas Supreme Court on April 7, 2011.

Electoral history

1984

1990

2014
Chris Piazza is running for re-election to the Sixth Circuit. He is running unopposed in the general election for the Sixth Circuit on May 20, 2014.

Appointments
Piazza was appointed by Bill Clinton, during his time as Arkansas governor, to chair a panel that was drafting state ethics legislation. Due to this appointment, Piazza recused himself from a later case to disbar Clinton.

References

Arkansas Democrats
Arkansas state court judges
Lawyers from Little Rock, Arkansas
Living people
Year of birth missing (living people)
Place of birth missing (living people)